Anthony Edward Dudley is a Gibraltarian barrister, and one of the two judges of the Supreme Court of Gibraltar. He is married and has three daughters.

Biography 
Dudley was called to the Bar in 1989. After working several years in private practice, he became Registrar to the Supreme Court of Gibraltar, and subsequently, Stipendiary Magistrate and Coroner. After being appointed Additional Judge, became Acting Chief Justice in September 2007.

He was appointed Chief Justice on 1 February 2010, by the Governor Sir Adrian Johns. Dudley is the first Gibraltarian to occupy this position as holder.

Controversies 
In April 2011, under Dudley's guidance, the Supreme Court of Gibraltar ruled that consensual sex (both for heterosexual and male homosexuals) would be considered legal from the age of 16. Previously, gay men were only legally allowed to have sexual intercourse from the age of 18. Also, the Supreme Court declared that criminalisation of consensual anal sex among heterosexuals was unconstitutional. Both decisions were strongly criticised by some sectors of  Gibraltarian civil society, particularly by the Gibraltar Women's Association and the Evangelical Alliance. However, the government made it clear that the question still depended on a referendum to be held on an undetermined date.

References

External links 
 The Judiciary - Gibraltar Courts Service

Living people
Year of birth missing (living people)
Chief justices of Gibraltar
Gibraltarian barristers
20th-century Gibraltarian judges
21st-century Gibraltarian judges